Roman Vladimirovich Kutuzov (16 February 1969 – 5 June 2022) was a Russian lieutenant general who was killed during the 2022 Russian invasion of Ukraine.

Biography
When Kutuzov was a colonel, he commanded the 38th Separate Communications Regiment of the Russian Airborne Forces (military unit 54164).

In 2017, Kutuzov was the acting commander of the 5th Combined Arms Army. In 2019, he was interim commander of the 29th Combined Arms Army. In 2020, Kutuzov was the chief of staff of the 29th Combined Arms Army.

Kutuzov was killed on 5 June 2022 in the village of Mykolaivka, during the battle for Sievierodonetsk–Lysychansk near Lysychansk, Ukraine, while commanding the 1st Army Corps of the Donetsk People's Republic. Reports of his death originated on Russian milblogger Telegram channels and were later confirmed by Russian state media. He was buried in the Federal Military Memorial Cemetery on 7 June 2022.

Kutuzov's promotion to lieutenant general was announced posthumously.

Awards

 Order "For Merit to the Fatherland"
 Order of Honour
 Order of Kutuzov
 Order of Courage
 Order of Military Merit
 Medal "For Courage"

See also
 List of Russian generals killed during the 2022 invasion of Ukraine

References

1969 births
2022 deaths
Frunze Military Academy alumni
Military Academy of the General Staff of the Armed Forces of Russia alumni
Russian major generals
Eastern Ukraine offensive
Russian military personnel killed in the 2022 Russian invasion of Ukraine
Recipients of the Medal "For Courage" (Russia)
Recipients of the Medal of Zhukov
Recipients of the Order of Courage
Recipients of the Order of Honour (Russia)
Recipients of the Order of Military Merit (Russia)
People of the Donetsk People's Republic
People from Vladimir, Russia
Burials at the Federal Military Memorial Cemetery